White Feather is a 1955 American CinemaScope Western film directed by Robert D. Webb and starring Robert Wagner. The movie was filmed in Durango, Mexico. The story is based on fact; however, the particulars of the plot and the characters of the story are fictional.

Plot synopsis
The story of the peace mission from the US cavalry to the Cheyenne Indians in Wyoming during the 1870s. The Cheyenne agree to leave their hunting grounds so that white settlers can move in to search for gold. Colonel Lindsay (John Lund) and land surveyor Josh Tanner (Robert Wagner) are in charge of the resettlement, but the mission is threatened when Appearing Day (Debra Paget), the sister of Little Dog (Jeffrey Hunter) and fiancée of Cheyenne tribesman American Horse (Hugh O'Brian), falls for Tanner.

When Appearing Day runs away to join Tanner at the fort, American Horse follows, seeking to kill him. He is captured, but later freed by Little Dog and the two ride off to the hills. Tanner, Col. Lindsay and a troop of soldiers go to the Cheyenne camp where Chief Broken Hand (Eduard Franz) has agreed to sign a peace treaty. After the signing, a warrior rides up and throws down a knife with a white feather attached, a declaration of war by American Horse and Little Dog against all the soldiers. Tanner convinces the Chief to allow the matter to be resolved between themselves.

Cast
 Robert Wagner as Josh Tanner
 Debra Paget as Appearing Day
 John Lund as Col. Lindsay
 Jeffrey Hunter as Little Dog
 Eduard Franz as Chief Broken Hand
 Noah Beery Jr. as Lt. Ferguson
 Virginia Leith as Ann Magruder
 Emile Meyer as Magruder
 Hugh O'Brian as American Horse
 Milburn Stone as Commissioner Trenton
 Iron Eyes Cody as Indian Chief

Production
The film was based on the magazine story My Great Aunt Appearing Day by John Prebble which concerns a Native American woman who marries a British major.

Film rights were purchased by Panoramic Productions, a company under Leonard Goldstein, who had a ten picture deal with 20th Century Fox. Delmer Daves did the original script. It was the last of Panoramic's ten picture deal (replacing another intended project, Hawk of the Desert) before they left to set up at United Artists, and their first in CinemaScope. Robert Webb was assigned to direct and Robert Jacks (vice president at Panoramic) to produce. The lead cast originally announced in June 1954 were all Fox contractees – Robert Wagner, Jeffrey Hunter, Terry Moore, Dale Robertson and Rita Moreno.

Moreno was replaced by Debra Paget. Moore and Robertson would not appear in the final film.

Filming began in July 1954 in Durango, Mexico. It was the first Hollywood movie shot in Durango, which would become a regular location for Hollywood films, especially Westerns.

Early into the shoot, Goldstein died unexpectedly.

Reception
The film was a moderate box-office success earning North American rentals of $1,650,000.

See also
 List of American films of 1955

Footnotes

References

External links
 
 
 
 

1955 films
20th Century Fox films
1955 Western (genre) films
American Western (genre) films
Films directed by Robert D. Webb
Films scored by Hugo Friedhofer
Films set in Wyoming
Films set in the 1870s
CinemaScope films
1950s English-language films
1950s American films